The 2011 European Modern Pentathlon Championships were held in Medway, Great Britain from July 28 to August 1, 2011.

Medal summary

Men's events

Women's events

Medal table

References

External links
 Results

2011
2011 in modern pentathlon
2011 in English sport
International sports competitions hosted by England
Sport in Medway
2011 European Modern Pentathlon Championships
July 2011 sports events in the United Kingdom
August 2011 sports events in the United Kingdom